The Ambassador of France to Australia is an officer of the French Ministry of Foreign Affairs and International Development and the head of the Embassy of the French Republic to the Commonwealth of Australia. The position has the rank and status of an Ambassador Extraordinary and Plenipotentiary and holds non-resident accreditation for Fiji and Papua New Guinea. The ambassador is based with the embassy in Perth Avenue, Yarralumla in Canberra.

The Ambassador is currently Jean-Pierre Thébault, and France and Australia have enjoyed diplomatic relations since 1944, although consular representation has existed in Australia and its previous colonies. In 1836, King Louis-Philippe created the first Australian Consulate in Sydney. Opened in 1842, the Sydney consulate was followed by one in Melbourne in 1854. During the Second World War, there existed two French delegations to Australia: one on behalf of the Vichy government, the other for the Free French. These delegations combined in July 1944 following Australia's formal recognition of the Free French forces as the legitimate government of France and Pierre Augé was appointed Minister by the provisional government of Charles de Gaulle in December 1944.

Ambassadors, 1945–present

See also
Australia–France relations
Foreign relations of France
List of Australian ambassadors to France

References

External links
La France en Australie

France
Australia